New Columbus may refer to:

New Columbus, Indiana
New Columbus, Pennsylvania